Jonathan Baldwin Turner (December 7, 1805 – January 10, 1899) was a classical scholar, botanist, and political activist. He was heavily involved in the social movement of the 1850s that produced the land grant universities, pioneering public higher education in the United States.  Turner was also involved in the establishment of the University of Illinois.

Biography
Turner was a student of classical literature at Yale University and an aspiring missionary who, upon graduating in 1833, set out to the wilds of Illinois.  In 1833, Turner became a professor at the newly organized Illinois College at Jacksonville, Illinois, where Turner encountered Pottawatomie Indians, and witnessed terrible outbreaks of cholera.  At Jacksonville, Turner soon found himself involved in the question of slavery, becoming the editor of a Jacksonville abolitionist paper, an assistant with the Underground Railroad, and, in the classroom, a vocal opponent of slavery.

Agricultural Research
While a professor at Illinois College, Turner began to search for a plant that might serve as a hedge to help divide and cultivate expanses of open prairie.  In the later 1830s Turner selected the Maclura pomifera (the Osage orange) as an ideal plant for this purpose, and patented a machine for preparing the soil and planting these seeds.  Turner advertised and sold Osage Orange seeds, which were widely used as hedges before the development of barbed wire between 1867 and 1874.

Educational Activism
His religious views were the subject of an investigation by the Illinois Presbyterian Synod, and his abolitionism a subject of growing controversy, Turner in 1848 resigned from his teaching post as chair of belles lettres and literature at Illinois College.  After his departure, Turner expanded his agricultural research and created the Illinois Industrial League to advocate for a publicly funded system to provide "industrial" education, suited for the needs of the working ("industrial") classes.

Turner faced stiff opposition from traditional colleges, as well as from those opposed to non-sectarian education. In 1853, his farm was burned to the ground.  But Turner (who was deeply religious, although not orthodox) pressed hard, and generated considerable enthusiasm for his model of education.  In 1862, the Morrill Land-Grant Colleges Act was passed, which, after the American Civil War, brought Turner's ideas to fruition in the public Land Grant Universities of the United States.

The precise importance of Turner's contribution to the establishment of the land grant university has been the subject of some dispute. Vermont Senator Justin Morrill was reluctant to credit Turner as the primary author of the movement, and some have argued that Morrill's contribution, as sponsoring senator, was more important. 

Turner was displeased with the political process that saw the University of Illinois (or "Illinois Industrial University," as it was originally named) located in Urbana, Illinois, far from the industrial workers of Chicago.  Turner spoke at the laying of the University's cornerstone, and his words: "Industrial education prepares the way for a millennium of labor." remain in stone above the University's main quadrangle.

Later Years
In his later years, Turner devoted his energy to other causes.  He became a strident opponent of corporations, and an advocate of the rights of mentally ill people, who suffered under terrible conditions in the asylums of the nineteenth-century.  He also wrote religious tracts championing the liberal teachings of Christ, and criticizing Catholicism, Mormonism, and traditional religious institutions generally.

Death and legacy
Turner died at the age of 93 and is buried in Diamond Grove Cemetery in Jacksonville, Illinois.

Jonathan Baldwin Turner Hall at the University of Illinois at Urbana–Champaign, Turner Hall at Illinois State University, Turner Hall at Illinois College, and Jonathan Turner Junior High School in Jacksonville are named in Turner's honor.

Turner's papers are held by the Illinois History and Lincoln Collections of the University of Illinois Library at Urbana-Champaign.

References 

 Brown, Donald Raymond.  "The Educational Contributions of Jonathan Baldwin Turner." M.A. Thesis, University of Illinois, 1954.
 Hancock, Judith Ann. "Jonathan Baldwin Turner, A Study of an Educational Reformer." Ph.D. Thesis, University of Washington, 1971.
 Turner, Mary Carriel. The Life of Jonathan Baldwin Turner. Urbana: University of Illinois Press, 1961.

1805 births
1899 deaths
People from Jacksonville, Illinois
Yale University alumni
Illinois College faculty
University of Illinois Urbana-Champaign people
Underground Railroad people